This is a list of Nigerian films released in 1994.

Films

See also 

 List of Nigerian films

References 

1994
Lists of 1994 films by country or language
1994 in Nigeria
1990s in Nigerian cinema